Jack Frost is a 1997 American direct-to-video black comedy slasher film written and directed by Michael Cooney. It takes place in the fictional town of Snowmonton, where (on the week before Christmas) a truck carrying serial killer Jack Frost (Scott MacDonald) to his execution crashes into a genetics truck. The genetic material causes Jack's body to mutate and fuse with the snow on the ground. Jack is presumed dead and his body melts away. However, he comes back as a killer snowman and takes revenge on the man who finally caught him, Sheriff Sam Tiler (Christopher Allport).

Despite being critically panned, the film has developed a cult following for its comical death scenes and poor special effects and was followed by a sequel in 2000, Jack Frost 2: Revenge of the Mutant Killer Snowman. Jack Frost marked the film debut of Shannon Elizabeth.

Plot
On a snowy December night, a state execution transfer vehicle crosses into the quiet backwater town of Snowmonton. Inside is serial killer Jack Frost, who eluded police for years and left a trail of thirty-eight bodies across eleven states before finally being arrested by Sam Tiler, the sheriff of Snowmonton. Jack is scheduled to be executed at midnight, but he kills the guard and the vehicle crashes into a genetic research truck. Jack is exposed to chemicals from inside the truck, causing him to dissolve and fuse with the snow.

Despite news reports of Jack's demise, Sam cannot forget Jack's threats of vengeance. Old Man Harper is found murdered, and soon afterward a local bully named Billy is killed when he is pushed into the way of an oncoming sled, getting decapitated. According to Sam’s son, Ryan, a snowman caused Billy's death. Billy's father, Jake, is murdered when the same snowman stuffs an axe into his throat. Billy's mother, Sally, is later killed when the snowman strangles her with Christmas lights, shoves her face into a box of glass ornaments, and slams a light-up snowflake into the top of her head.

FBI Agents Manners and Stone arrive in Snowmonton and convince the Sheriff to put the town on 24-hour curfew, sending his officers out to gather all the townspeople. Deputy Chris Pullman is killed when the snowman runs the officer over with a police cruiser. Billy's older sister Jill and her boyfriend Tommy sneak into the sheriff's home to steal his wine and have sex, as revenge for her brother's death. The snowman kills Tommy with icicles and pretends to be bath water to lure in Jill. Jack, then, re-solidifies with Jill in the tub, trapping her arms in his shoulders, and rapes her with a carrot on his crotch while repeatedly slamming her against the wall, ultimately killing her.

The snowman returns with the police cruiser to the station, finally confronting Sam. Agent Stone reveals himself to be a representative of the genetic research company that created the chemicals and reveals that the snowman is a mutated Jack Frost. He also reveals that the human soul exists as a chemical and that the acid was going to be used to contain DNA in case of a nuclear holocaust. They attempt to destroy Jack by blowing him up by releasing aerosol cans in the police station and firing a bullet at him, but to no avail. They then use blowdryers to drive Jack into a furnace, which evaporates the snowman. Jack condenses, killing Stone and wounding Manners. Jack traps Sam and Ryan in his car, but Sam escapes by inadvertently throwing the oatmeal Ryan made him at Jack, burning the snowman's head. Ryan put antifreeze in the oatmeal, believing it could help keep his father from getting cold.

Sam tells his friend, Paul Davrow to fill the bed of his truck with antifreeze. Jack chases Sam through the halls of a church and finally catches him, driving an icicle into his chest and almost killing him. The truck full of antifreeze arrives just in time, however, and Jack and Sam crash through a window and into the truck's bed. Jack Frost melts in the antifreeze, and the antifreeze is poured back into the containers and buried deep under the ground of Snowmonton. Sam's wife Anne, realizes that the state police are on their way. When Paul asks Sam what they are going to tell them, Sam says, "We'll tell them that it's too late". However, one of the containers is shown to be bubbling, revealing Jack is still alive.

Cast

 Scott MacDonald as Jack Frost
 Christopher Allport as Sam Tiler 
 Stephen Mendel as Agent Manners
 F. William Parker as Paul Davrow
 Eileen Seeley as Anne Tiler
 Rob LaBelle as Agent Stone
 Zack Eginton as Ryan Tiler
 Jack Lindine as Jake Metzner
 Kelly Jean Peters as Sally Metzner
 Marsha Clark as Marla
 Shannon Elizabeth as Jill Metzner
 Chip Heller as Deputy Joe Foster
 Brian Leckner as Deputy Chris Pullman
 Darren O. Campbell as Tommy Davrow
 Paul Keith as Doc Peters
 Charles C. Stevenson, Jr. as Father Branagh
 Nathan Hague as Billy Metzner

Production
In an interview with Fangoria, writer Michael Cooney revealed that he also served as director for the film because "(we) couldn't afford a director". Further addressing the low budget of the film, Cooney references Campbell Soup's "Let it Snow" advertisement and notes that that commercial (which similarly features a living snowman character) had a budget "three times" that of the film. Furthermore, he stated that Identity, another film he wrote, had a budget of $30 million, while Jack Frost was made for "the cost of its catering budget".

Portions of the film were filmed at the Fawn Lodge in Fawnskin, California, on the north west shore of Big Bear Lake.

Reception

Grave Reviews gave the film 2.5 out of 5 Graves.

Sequel
A sequel, Jack Frost 2: Revenge of the Mutant Killer Snowman, was released in 2000. A third installment was planned with the tentative title of Jack Frost 3: Jackzilla, but hopes of the sequel being made are unlikely because of the death of Christopher Allport in 2008.

Home media
It was released on VHS by A-Pix Entertainment and DVD by Simitar Entertainment in 1997. Both releases have been long out of print.

On December 13, 2016, Vinegar Syndrome released the film for the first time on Blu-ray. It includes the film digitally remastered in a 2K presentation. Special features included an audio commentary, a video introduction by director Michael Cooney, and a video interview with actor Scott MacDonald and director of photography Dean Lent.

References

Further reading

External links
 
 

1997 films
1997 horror films
1990s Christmas horror films
American Christmas horror films
American comedy horror films
American science fiction horror films
American slasher films
American serial killer films
American monster movies
Jack Frost
Fictional snowmen
Films set in Colorado
Films shot in Big Bear Lake, California
American films about revenge
Slasher comedy films
American exploitation films
1990s slasher films
American splatter films
1990s English-language films
1990s American films